Line 21 may refer to:

Closed Captioning
 EIA-608, a standard for closed captioning for NTSC TV broadcast

A Railway Line

In operation
 Line 21 (Guangzhou Metro), a metro line of the  Guangzhou Metro in China
 Line 21 (Zürich), Switzerland 
 Yangluo Line, a metro line of the Wuhan Metro in China

Under Planning
 Line 21 (São Paulo Metro), a future metro line of the São Paulo metro
 Line 21 (Shanghai Metro), a future metro line of Shanghai Metro